Bjerkvik Church is a parish church of the Church of Norway in Narvik Municipality in Nordland county, Norway. It is located in the village of Bjerkvik. It is the church for the Bjerkvik parish which is part of the Ofoten prosti (deanery) in the Diocese of Sør-Hålogaland. The white, concrete church was built in a long church style in 1955 using plans drawn up by the architects Arnstein Arneberg and Per Solemslie. The church seats about 320 people.

History
The first church was built in Bjerkvik in 1914. Allied forces destroyed it on 13 April 1940, during World War II. Its replacement was completed in 1955 and consecrated that same year on 14 August by the Bishop Wollert Krohn-Hansen.

Media gallery

See also
List of churches in Sør-Hålogaland

References

Narvik
Churches in Nordland
Wooden churches in Norway
20th-century Church of Norway church buildings
Churches completed in 1955
1914 establishments in Norway
Long churches in Norway
Concrete churches in Norway